Bossiaea arcuata is a species of flowering plant in the family Fabaceae and is endemic to a small area in Western Australia. It is an erect, openly-branched, more or less leafless shrub with often arched cladodes, and yellow and red pea-like flowers.

Description

Taxonomy and naming
Bossiaea arcuata was first formally described in 2006 by James Henderson Ross in the journal Muelleria from specimens collected south of Norseman in 2000. The specific epithet (arcuata) means "curved like a bow" referring to the shaped of the cladodes.

Distribution and habitat
This bossiaea is only known from the Picnic Lake area south of Norseman in Western Australia, where it grows in deep sand on the edge of the salt lake.

Conservation status
Bossiaea arcuata is classified as "Priority One" by the Government of Western Australia Department of Parks and Wildlife, meaning that it is known from only one or a few locations which are potentially at risk.

References

arcuata
Eudicots of Western Australia
Plants described in 2006